Ben Lake (born 3 May 1990) is a British ice hockey player for Belfast Giants and the British national team.

Lake has previously played for ECHL side Alaska Aces and British EIHL teams Coventry Blaze and Manchester Storm.

In November 2020, with the 2020-21 EIHL season indefinitely suspended due to coronavirus, Lake dropped down a division and joined NIHL side Sheffield Steeldogs for their 'Streaming Series'.

He represented Great Britain at the 2019 IIHF World Championship, 2021 IIHF World Championship and 2022 IIHF World Championship.

References

External links

1990 births
Living people
Alaska Aces (ECHL) players
British ice hockey forwards
Coventry Blaze players
Belfast Giants players
Fort McMurray Oil Barons players
Manchester Storm (2015–) players
Sacred Heart Pioneers men's ice hockey players
Ice hockey people from Calgary
Canadian ice hockey forwards
Canadian expatriate ice hockey players in the United States